Tony George or Anthony George may refer to:
Anthony George (1921–2005), American actor
Anthony C. George (born 1938), Grenadian artist
Anthony Hastings George (1886–1944), British diplomat
Tony George (born 1959), American auto racing executive
Tony George (American football) (born 1975), American football defensive back
Tony George (politician), American politician from Missouri
Tony George (weightlifter) (1919–2006), New Zealand weightlifter

See also
George Anthony (disambiguation)